Eloy Francois Maurice Gilbert Charles Prosper de Jong (born March 13, 1973) is a Dutch pop singer and moderator. He became known in the early 1990s as a member of the English-Dutch boy group Caught in the Act. In 2004, he made a comeback as a solo singer. In 2018, he reached number 1 on the German album charts with his German-language albums.

Life 

Eloy Francois Maurice Gilbert Charles Prosper de Jong was born on March 13, 1973, in The Hague, Netherlands.

As a teenager, Eloy de Jong was the Dutch youth champion in Latin American dance. In 1993, producer Cees van Leeuwen was searching for four young men to create a boy band called Caught in the Act. De Jong was chosen as one of the four members. After their initial failures, the band made a breakthrough in the Netherlands and Germany after performing in the RTL soap opera Gute Zeiten, Schlechte Zeiten in November 1994. Their success was mostly focused on Germany, and by 1998 the band had placed three albums in the German top ten and sold more than 20 million records. After a farewell concert on August 16, 1998, in Magdeburg, the band split up.

In the summer of 1999, de Jong came back into the public eye when he and his partner, Irish singer Stephen Gately from the band Boyzone, became the first members of boy bands to come out as gay. In 2002, the two separated. After that, De Jong had a relationship with the moderator Carlo Boszhard for a while.

In 2004, he started his career as a solo singer and landed a minor hit in Germany with the single Angel In Disguise.This was followed by several other hit songs, like Regenbogen (Rainbows) (2017), Egal was andere sagen (No matter what others say) (2018), and Liebe kann so weh tun (Love can hurt) (2018) a duet with Marianne Rosenberg. In 2021 had scored a big hit with "Bist du's Oder Bist du's Nicht (Are you or are you not?), a duet with Beatrice Egli. His 2018 album Kopf aus - Herz an (Head up, Heart on) went to number 1 in the German charts. While his follow up album in 2020 Auf das Leben-Fertig-Los! (It's about life-Ready-Go!) reached number 2.

De Jong started a family a few years ago, and he and his partner became fathers of a daughter and a son. Unfortunately, the son died at birth. The girl was raised by the two fathers and her mother, according to the model of coparenting.

 Discography 
 Albums 
 2018: Kopf aus – Herz an 2020: Auf das Leben – fertig – los!Singles
 2004: Angel in Disguise 2017: Regenbogen 2018: Egal was andere sagen 2018: Schritt für Schritt 2018: Liebe kann so weh tun (with Marianne Rosenberg)
 2018: An deiner Seite 2019: Kopf aus, Herz an ... und tanz! Samba 2019: Dieses Lied (Herzstück Amazon Original) 2020: Solange wir uns haben 2020: Barfuß im Regen 2022: Ich sage ja (You Raise Me Up)''

Awards

2019 
 Die Eins der Besten, category: „Newcomer des Jahres“ ("Newcomer of the year")
 smago! Award, category: „Senkrechtstarter des Jahres“ ("Whiz of the year")

Notes

External links 

 Eloy de Jong on Facebook

References 

Dutch pop musicians
Dutch pop singers
1973 births
Living people
Dutch LGBT singers
20th-century Dutch people